Mashed may refer to:

 Mashed, that created from mash ingredients
 Mashed, the result of a mashing
 Mashed, the result of a mashup (music)
 Mashed (album), a 2007 mashup album
 Mashed (video game), a vehicular combat video game
 Mashed.com, a food website

See also

 
 Mashed potato (disambiguation)
 Mashable
 Mashup (disambiguation)
 Masher (disambiguation)
 Mash (disambiguation)
 Mish Mash (disambiguation)